The Magical World of Roger Whittaker is the 8th album by Roger Whittaker. It is a collection of children's music. It was released in 1975 on the EMI budget label Music for Pleasure in the U.K. and by RCA Records in the U.S.

Release

UK release
Music for Pleasure – MFP (UK) (1975)

US release
Label: RCA – ANL1-1405
Format: LP Album
Country: USA
Released: 1975

Track listing

References
 
 
 
 
 

https://www.rogerwhittaker.com/letters3-08.html

1975 albums